Lega Trentino, whose complete name is , is a regionalist political party active in Trentino. The party was a "national" section of Lega Nord (LN) from 1991 to 2000 and has been the regional section of Lega per Salvini Premier (LSP) in Trentino since 2020.

The party is led by pro-tempore commissioner Diego Binelli.

Maurizio Fugatti, who led the party from 2005 to 2018, has been President of Trentino since 2018.

History
The party was founded in 1990 by some Trentino autonomists who wanted to join Lega Nord, as the Trentino Tyrolean Autonomist Party (PATT) had refused to do so. They included Elisabetta Bertotti, Erminio Boso (former member of Integral Autonomy and the PATT), Sergio Divina (former member of the Italian Liberal Party), Sergio Muraro and Alessandro Savoi. Divina was the party's first secretary until 1995, when he was replaced by Savoi. 

In the 1992 general election the LNT won 13.9% of the vote, electing Bertotti to the Chamber of Deputies and Boso to the Senate. In the 1993 provincial election the party obtained 16.2% and six regional councillors, including Divina and Muraro. In the 1996 general election the LNT, which had ejected Bertotti for supporting Lorenzo Dellai, the centre-left candidate, for mayor of Trento in 1995, increased its share to 20.8%. Then, the party underwent a period of decline.

For the 2001 general election the LNT, led by Rolando Fontan, joined forces with the PATT. Both Fontan and Denis Bertolini, who successively led the LNT from 1999 to 2003, left the party. The latter launched the alternative United Valleys party, while the former would make a comeback in 2018. However, in 2005 the party elected a long-lasting leadership, formed by Maurizio Fugatti (who would be elected to the Chamber in 2006 and 2008) as secretary and Savoi as president.

In the 2008 provincial election Divina stood for President of Trentino, supported by an autonomist coalition comprising also The People of Freedom (PdL), but was defeated by incumbent Dellai by a landslide. LNT
won 18.4% of the vote (combined result of the party's list, 14.1%, and Divina's personal list, 4.3%), passing the PdL (12.3%) in the Province and getting eight deputies elected, six from the party's list and two from Divina's list.

In the 2013 general election the LNT lost its representation in the Chamber, while Divina was re-elected to the Senate as the coalition's best loser, having lost in his single-seat constituency. In the 2013 provincial election Fugatti, deprived of his parliamentary seat, ran for President, winning 6.6% and 6.2% for the party.

In the 2018 general election the party won 26.7% of the vote and obtained a record of five deputies, but no senators.

In the 2018 provincial election the party won 27.1% of the vote and Fugatti was contextually elected President of Trentino with 46.7%.

Popular support
Contrarily to other regional sections of Lega Nord, the party scores better in general elections than in provincial elections, in which it suffers more competition by other regionalist parties, such as the Trentino Tyrolean Autonomist Party.

The electoral results of Lega Nord Trentino in the province of Trentino are shown in the table below.

Leadership
Secretary: Sergio Divina (1991–1995), Alessandro Savoi (1995–1999), Rolando Fontan (1999–2001), Denis Bertolini (2001–2003), Sergio Divina (2003–2005), Maurizio Fugatti (2005–2018), Mirko Bisesti (2018–2020), Diego Binelli (commissioner, 2020–present)
President: Sergio Muraro (1992–1993), Gianbattista Sordo (1993–1995), Sergio Divina (1995–1999), Marco Tomasi (1999–2001), Lorenzo Conci (2001–2003), Alessandro Savoi (2005–2020)

Gallery

References

External links
Official website
Official website (old)

 
1990 establishments in Italy
Federalist parties in Italy
Lega Nord
Political parties established in 1991
Political parties in Trentino